Hugo Dittfach (20 September 1936 – 1 November 2021) was a Canadian jockey. Dittfach survived three years as a boy in a Russian concentration camp during World War II and went on to become a  National Champion Thoroughbred racing jockey in Canada where he would be inducted into the Canadian Horse Racing Hall of Fame in 1983 and the Halton Hills Sports Museum Hall of Fame in 2017.

References

1936 births
2021 deaths
People from Leer
Foreign Gulag detainees
Canadian jockeys
Avelino Gomez Memorial Award winners
Canadian Horse Racing Hall of Fame inductees
German emigrants to Canada